The 2014 partypoker Mosconi Cup, the 21st edition of the annual nine-ball pool competition between teams representing Europe and the United States, took place 1–4 December 2014 at the Tower Circus in Blackpool, England. 



Teams

Results

Monday, 1 December
Day review:

Tuesday, 2 December
Day review:

Wednesday, 3 December
Day review:

Thursday, 4 December
Day review:

References

External links
 Official homepage

2014
2014 in cue sports
December 2014 sports events in the United Kingdom